A translation project is a project that deals with the activity of translating. It may also refer to:
 LOLCat Bible Translation Project, a wiki-based website aiming for a Bible in LOLspeak
 MediaWiki Translation Project, a coordination space for translating MediaWiki
 Wikipedia Translation Project, a coordination for translating Wikipedia
 WikiProject Translation, an interlingual collaboration space among Wikisources in various languages